Oxygala, known today as xynogala, was a dairy product consumed in the  cuisines of ancient Greece and Rome. Oxygala was a form of yogurt and was usually eaten with honey. The dish was also known among the ancient Persians.

See also

 Greek yogurt
 List of dairy products

References

Bibliography
 Dalby, A. Siren Feasts: A History of Food and Gastronomy in Greece. London: Routledge, 1996. 

Ancient Greek cuisine
Ancient dishes
Condiments
Roman cuisine